The 1912 Canton Professionals season was their fourth season in the Ohio League. The team finished with a record of 7–4.

Schedule

Game notes

References

Pro Football Archives: 1912 Canton Athletic Club

Canton Bulldogs seasons
Canton Bulldogs
Canton Bulldogs